Julia Croft is a New Zealand performance artist.

Biography 
Croft grew up in Auckland, New Zealand and graduated from Toi Whakaari: New Zealand Drama School in 2008 with a Bachelor of Performing Arts (Acting). She also completed a bachelor's degree in English and theatre at the University of Canterbury. Croft has also trained at L’Ecole Philippe Gaullier in Paris, France.

In 2017 she and Nisha Madhan co-created a live art act called Power Ballad, which won Best Performer and Best Live Art at the Auckland Fringe Festival and the Discovery Award at the Melbourne Fringe Festival.

References 

Living people
Toi Whakaari alumni
People from Auckland
Performance artists
Year of birth missing (living people)